Jung Whee-in (born April 17, 1995), known professionally as Wheein, is a South Korean singer under The L1ve. She is best known as a member and vocalist of South Korean girl group Mamamoo. In April 2018, Wheein made her debut as a solo artist with her digital single "Easy." In September 2019, she released her first single album, Soar.

Early life
Jung Whee-in was born in Jeonju, Jeollabuk-do, South Korea, where she lived with her grandmother as an only child. She graduated from Wonkwang Information Arts High School.

Career 
In June 2014, Wheein officially debuted as a member of Mamamoo, serving as one of the group's vocalists, when they released their debut single "Mr. Ambiguous" and EP Hello. She had first appeared in the group's first R&B collaboration, "Don't Be Happy", alongside member Solar and featuring Korean singer Bumkey, that January.
On April 17, 2018, Wheein debuted as a solo artist, releasing her first single, "Easy." On September 4, 2019, she released her first single album, Soar, with the single "Good Bye." Wheein's first physical release, Soar peaked at number four on the Gaon Album Chart, selling over 23,000 copies in 2019. The single "Good Bye" debuted Billboard World Digital Song Sales chart at position 24.

Wheein's debut EP, Redd, was released on April 13, 2021. It debuted at number seven on the Gaon Album Chart, making it her second top-ten debut on the chart. The EP was the 13th best-selling album of April 2021, with over 72,000 copies sold. Lead single "Water Color" debuted and peaked at number 70 on the Gaon Digital Chart and 15 on the Billboard World Digital Songs Sales chart. On April 23, the English version of "Water Color" was released as a digital single.

On June 11, 2021, Wheein decided not to renew her exclusive contract with RBW, but instead signed a deal with the company allowing her to promote with Mamamoo for at least 2 more years. On August 31, she signed an exclusive contract with Ravi's label, The L1ve.

On January 16, 2022, Wheein released her second EP, Whee, which is her first release under The L1ve.

Discography

Extended plays

Single album

Singles

As lead artist

As featured artist

Promotional singles

Other charted songs

Composition credits 
All song credits are adapted from the Korea Music Copyright Association's database unless stated otherwise.

Filmography

Television shows

Radio shows

Music videos

Awards and nominations

Notes

References

External links

1995 births
Living people
People from Jeonju
K-pop singers
South Korean female idols
South Korean women pop singers
South Korean jazz singers
21st-century South Korean women singers
Mamamoo members